Microlophus is a genus of tropidurid lizards native to South America.  Around 20 species are recognized and 10 of these are endemic to the Galápagos Islands, where they are commonly known as lava lizards (they are sometimes placed in Tropidurus instead). The remaining, which often are called Pacific iguanas, are found in the Andes and along the Pacific coasts of Chile, Peru, and Ecuador.

The distribution of the lava lizards and their variations in shape, colour, and behaviour show the phenomenon of adaptive radiation so typical of the inhabitants of this archipelago. One species occurs on all the central and western islands, which were perhaps connected during periods of lower sea levels, while one species each occurs on six other more peripheral islands. All have most likely evolved from a single ancestral species. However, as usual for the Tropiduridae, they can change their colour individually to some extent, and members of the same species occurring in different habitats also show colour differences. Thus, animals living mainly on dark lava are darker than ones that live in lighter, sandy environments.

Species

Listed alphabetically by specific name. (* endemic to the Galapágos Islands).
Microlophus albemarlensis  – Galápagos lava lizard*
Microlophus arenarius 
Microlophus atacamensis  – Atacamen Pacific iguana
Microlophus barringtonensis  – Santa Fe lava lizard*
Microlophus bivittatus  – San Cristóbal lava lizard*
Microlophus delanonis  – Española lava lizard or Hood lava lizard*
Microlophus duncanensis  – Pinzón lava lizard*
Microlophus grayii  – Floreana lava lizard*
Microlophus habelii  – Marchena lava lizard*
Microlophus heterolepis 
Microlophus indefatigabilis  – Santa Cruz lava lizard *
Microlophus jacobii   Santiago lava lizard *
Microlophus koepckeorum  – Frost's iguana
Microlophus occipitalis  – knobbed Pacific iguana
Microlophus pacificus  – Pinta lava lizard or common Pacific iguana*
Microlophus peruvianus  – Peru Pacific iguana
Microlophus quadrivittatus  – four-banded Pacific iguana
Microlophus tarapacensis  – Tarapaca Pacific iguana
Microlophus theresiae  – Theresia's Pacific iguana
Microlophus theresioides  – corredor de pica (in Spanish)
Microlophus thoracicus  – Tschudi's Pacific iguana
Microlophus tigris  – tiger Pacific iguana
Microlophus yanezi  – Yanez's lava lizard

Nota bene: A binomial authority in parentheses indicates that the species was originally described in a genus other than Microlophus.

References

External links

Further reading
Duméril AMC, Bibron G (1837). Erpétologie générale ou Histoire naturelle complète des Reptiles. Tome quatrième [Volume 4]. Paris: Roret. ii + 571 pp. (Microlophus, new genus, pp. 334–335). (in French).

 
Lizards of South America
Lizard genera
Taxa named by Gabriel Bibron
Taxa named by André Marie Constant Duméril